Paul Donald McGowan (April 8, 1947 – July 28, 2014) was an American politician from Maine. A Democrat, McGowan was elected to the Maine House of Representatives in 2012, replacing Bradley Moulton. He lived in the Cape Neddick neighborhood of York, Maine. In the Maine Legislature, McGowan was a member of the Environment and Natural Resources Committee and helped pass a signature cancer-related bill during his only term.

McGowan grew up in North Attleboro, Massachusetts with his parents and 5 brothers and sisters. He graduated from Providence College. McGowan committed suicide after a history of depression on July 28, 2014. He was not seeking re-election.

References

1947 births
2014 deaths
People from North Attleborough, Massachusetts
People from York, Maine
Providence College alumni
Democratic Party members of the Maine House of Representatives
American politicians who committed suicide
Suicides in Maine